NGC 1672 is a barred spiral galaxy located in the constellation Dorado. It was discovered by the astronomer James Dunlop on November 5, 1826. It was originally unclear whether it was a member of the Dorado Group, with some sources finding it to be a member and other sources rejecting its membership. However, recent tip of the red-giant branch (TRGB) measurements indicate that NGC 1672 is located at the same distance as other members, suggesting it is indeed a member of the Dorado Group.

NGC 1672 has a large bar which is estimated to measure around 20 kpc.  It has very strong radio emissions emanating from its nucleus, bar, and the inner portion of the spiral arm region. The nucleus is Seyfert type II and is engulfed by a starburst region. The strongest polarized emissions come from the northeastern region which is upstream from its dust lanes.  Magnetic field lines are at large angles with respect to the bar and turn smoothly to the center.

General structure
The center of the galaxy contains a high surface brightness bar, and four filament-like spiral arms extend outward from the ends of this bar. The spiral arms are asymmetric; one of the arms in the northeast part of the disk is significantly brighter than its counterpart on the other side.

Nucleus

The classification of the nucleus of NGC 1672 is uncertain.  Most galaxies may be classified by their spectra as having one of three different types of nuclei:
A nuclear H II region, a region which has a spectrum similar to that of star formation regions in the Milky Way and which therefore is associated with nuclear star formation activity.
A Seyfert nucleus, a type of active galactic nucleus (AGN) that may contain a supermassive black hole.
A low-ionization nuclear emission-line region, a type of nuclear region with spectral line emission from weakly ionized gas that could contain either a star formation region or a supermassive black hole.

NGC 1672, however, is one of several nearby galaxies that does not fit into this classification scheme, as its spectrum appears intermediary between these three classes of objects.  It may in fact contain both nuclear star formation regions and an AGN.  In some wave bands (such as in ultraviolet light), the star formation regions are the primary source of emission.

Gallery

See also
 NGC 1300-A barred spiral galaxy.
 NGC 7552-A very similar-looking barred spiral galaxy.

References

External links

 Hubblesite Newscenter: Pictures and description

Barred spiral galaxies
Seyfert galaxies
LINER galaxies
Dorado (constellation)
1672
15941
Dorado Group